Sawan Dutta is an Indian music director, composer, songwriter, record producer, vocalist and Vlogger based in Bengaluru, India. She is best known for her original songs at her video song blog, The Metronome.

Early life and education 
Dutta was born in New Delhi, India. She had an early interest in music and learned to play the harmonium at the age of three. During her early teenage years, she taught herself to play the Hawaiian Guitar and auditioned successfully to be a regular paid performer at the All-India Radio company. After high school, Dutta joined the School of Planning and Architecture in New Delhi, India to train as an architect. During her college years at the School of Planning and Architecture, she was a member of the musical band The Architypes. She also joined the pioneering fusion rock band Indian Ocean as a keyboardist and backup vocalist (and the only woman in the band ever) during her college years.

Career

Television

Dutta has created music for TV shows, such as the soundtracks for the Indian adaptations of the TV show "Who Wants to Be a Millionaire?" called "Kaun Banega Crorepati" in Hindi and "Ningalkkum Aakaar Kodeeswaran" in Malayalam.  Some of her other popular work on TV includes themes for Mastermind India, Bhanwar, India's Child Genius, The History of Whatever and the National Award-winning cartoon series Jungle Tales.

Film

Dutta has composed songs for Bollywood films including Chai Pani (2004).

Other

Dutta has also worked on several other music albums including her own solo debut album Lady Chatterjee with the music label Saregama (2005). She was a music producer for other performing artists including the Sarod Maestro Amjad Ali Khan and his sons Amaan and Ayaan Ali Khan, the flute player Ajay Prasanna, and the vocalist Vidya Shah.

Dutta has created soundtracks for documentary films such as the Underground Inferno for the National Geographic Channel and Autumn in the Himalayas for the Public Broadcasting Service Trust.

She has also created advertisement jingles and soundtracks for brands like the Indian car manufacturer Maruti, KFC, UNICEF and others.

Awards

Dutta was awarded the Mahindra Excellence in Theatre Awards for her soundtrack for the puppeteer Dadi Pudumjee's theatrical production, Transpositions in 2008.

The Metronome

Dutta is known for her videos on her YouTube channel and website - The Metronome in which she writes, composes and sings original songs on a number of subjects. Her recipe song series in which she demonstrates various recipes from the Bengal region has attracted a large following across the globe. Dutta has often collaborated with different advertising brands that sponsor her vlog posts. Chief among these are Mahindra Agri Ltd, Fortune Foods Ltd, and the restaurant chain Oh! Calcutta. Dutta writes, composes and sings almost all her vlog posts herself with help from her husband C. B. Arun Kumar who is a film-maker. The music for her songs covers various genres including pop, jazz, Western and Indian classical and electronica.  Some of her most popular vlog posts include An Ode to Boroline, Macher Jhol, Kosha Mangsho etc.

References

External links 
The Metronome on YouTube 

Living people
Music directors
Year of birth missing (living people)